Denny's Sho is a Canadian music variety television series which aired on CBC Television in 1978.

Premise
Denny Doherty, of The Mamas & the Papas, was host of this Halifax-produced variety series. The Lovin' Spoonful's John Sebastian and Zalman Yanovsky were guests on one episode. Other visiting artists were Salome Bey, Tom Gallant, Gloria Kaye, Moe Koffman, Marie-Paule Martin, Murray McLauchlan, Original Caste, Ryan's Fancy and Ken Tobias. At one point, Doherty sang "When I'm Sixty-Four" accompanied by his father playing a tuba.

Denny's Sho included the first public performance of the remaining members of The Mamas & the Papas since Cass Elliot's death four years earlier.

Scheduling
This half-hour series was broadcast on Thursdays at 9:00 p.m. (Eastern) from 1 June to 7 September 1978.

References

External links

 
 

CBC Television original programming
1978 Canadian television series debuts
1978 Canadian television series endings
1970s Canadian variety television series
1970s Canadian music television series